Salamis or Salamina is the largest Greek island in the Saronic Gulf, about  off-coast from Piraeus and about  west of central Athens. The chief city, Salamina, lies in the west-facing core of the crescent on Salamis Bay, which opens into the Saronic Gulf. On the eastern side of the island is its main port, Paloukia, in size second in Greece only to the port of Piraeus.

Etymology
The traditional etymology of Salamis derives it from the eponymous nymph Salamis, the mother of Cychreus, the legendary first king of the island. A more modern theory considers "Salamis" to come from the root sal 'salt' and -amis 'middle'; thus Salamis would be the place amid salt water. Other  theories have attempted to connect the name to the Semitic root Š-L-M 'health, safety, peace', because of the well-sheltered harbor.

From at least the 13th century until the 19th century, the town, the island, and the bay of Salamis were called , because of its round shape. The ancient name was revived in the 19th century. The name Koulouri is still used informally for the town.

History 

Salamis was probably first colonised by Aegina and later occupied by Megara, but became an Athenian possession in the time of Solon or Peisistratos, following the war between Athens and Megara around 600 BC.  According to Strabo, the ancient capital was at the south of the island; in classical times it was to the east, on the Kamatero Peninsula overlooking the Strait of Salamis; in modern times it is on the west.

According to Homer's Iliad, Salamis took part in the Trojan War with twelve ships under the leadership of Ajax.

Salamis island is known for the Battle of Salamis, the decisive naval victory of the allied Greek fleet, led by Themistocles, over the Persian Empire in 480 BC. It is said to be the birthplace of Ajax and Euripides, the latter's birth being popularly placed on the day of the battle. In modern times, it is home to Salamis Naval Base, headquarters for the Hellenic Navy.

Arvanites were recorded among the inhabitants of the island in 1688. They lived in poverty as most of the Albanians in Greece at the time.

The oldest known counting board was discovered on Salamis Island in 1899. It is thought to have been used by the Babylonians in about 300 BC and is more a gaming board than a calculating device.

In the 1960s and 1970s, during the military junta period, changes in land legislation allowed the subdivision of land plots. This opened the island to massive unplanned and unregulated urban and suburban development, including many weekend homes, especially along the northern and eastern coasts. The lack of corresponding investment in infrastructure, combined with heavy industry, has led to sea and beach pollution on this side of the island. There are, however, ongoing initiatives such as help from the European Union's Cohesion Fund toward improving sewerage by 2008.

An oil spill occurred off the coast of Salamis Island in September 2017.

Geography 

A significant part of Salamina is rocky and mountainous. On the southern part of the island a pine forest is located, which is unusual for western Attica. Unfortunately, this forest is often a target for fires. While the inland inhabitants are mainly employed within the agricultural sector, the majority of Salamis' inhabitants work in maritime occupations (fishing, ferries, and the island's shipyards) or commute to work in Athens.

Salamina is very popular for holiday and weekend visits from Athens mainland; its population rises to 300,000 in peak season of which c. 31,000 are permanent inhabitants. This supports a strong service industry sector, with many cafes, bars, ouzeries, tavernas and consumer goods shops throughout the island. On the south of the island, away from the port, there are a number of less developed areas with good swimming beaches including those of Aianteio, Maroudi, Perani, Peristeria, Kolones, Saterli, Selenia, and Kanakia.

Climate

According to the meteorological station of the National Observatory of Athens and Harokopio University, Salamina has a hot semi-arid climate with mild winters and very hot summers.

Municipality 

Salamina Island belongs to the Islands regional unit of the Attica region. Since the 2011 local government reform the island is administered as one municipality. Before, the island was divided into two municipalities, that became municipal units at the reform:
Salamina
Ampelakia

Its second-largest town is Aiánteio (pop. 5,888).

Population 
As of the mid-20th century, the majority of the inhabitants were Arvanite; a thing that changed during the past 20 years due to settlement of a lot of Athenians on the island to the degree that nowadays Arvanites are a fraction of the population, living mainly in the towns of Salamina, Ampelakia, and Moulki (Aianteion).

Villages in the municipal unit of Salamina

Paloukia 

Paloukia (Greek: Παλούκια, population 1,695) is located in the northeast of the island. Many ferryboats, fishing vessels and port police craft dock in this harbor. Paloukia is the base for the port police department of Salamina.
Most visitors who come to Salamina first arrive at Paloukia via ferryboats that run between Paloukia and Perama or Piraeus.

The area is adjacent to the Salamis Naval Base (in Greek ), which is a major base of the Hellenic Navy.

Aianteio 
Aianteio (population 4,860 as of 2011) is a large village in the southwestern part of Salamis Island and is named after Ajax, the leader of the Salamineans from Homer's Iliad. The village was known as  until 1915. In the region, there are churches from the 11th and 12th centuries such as Saint John and Saint Dimitrios.

Interesting places to visit are:
the oldest church in the island, Saint John the "Kalyvitis", which dates back to the 10th century and has remarkable hagiographies
the monastery of Saint Nicolas which dates back to the 18th century and is situated in a forest.

Batsi 

In the mountain, there is a cave of archeological interest that has not been investigated yet. In the winter there are few tourists; it is more popular with vacationers from Athens during the summer months.

Kaki Vigla 

Kaki Vigla (pop. 236) is a small community located at the south of Salamis Island, near Aianteio.

The beaches of Kaki Vigla are relatively clean and the area has pine and olive trees near the shore.

Agios Georgios 
A new village, founded in 1960.

Peristeria 
Peristeria (pop. 456) is a small village in the southeast of the island  from Salamis City. It took its name from the bird of peace, the dove, because it is a calm, peaceful and isolated place, away from the cars and from noise. Another interpretation says that its name may be derived from the doves which were living and had nests in the area. The area has a marina, which has yachts and fishing boats. The beaches of Peristeria are the cleanest of Salamis. The village is near the Cave of Euripides, associated with the famous ancient playwright.

Psili Ammos 
Psili Ammos (pop. 271), which means Fine Sand is so named because it is covered with sand. The area is located at the northwest of the island opposite of Elefsina. In the area there is one of the oldest landmarks, the chantry of Saint Grigorios (Saint Gregory).

Steno 
Steno (pop. 985), is a small community in the northwest of Salamis Island. The area is separated from Fanaromeni Monastery by a hill with shrubs and pine trees. The area is adjacent to the bay of Agios Georgios. Steno has wide and well-planned roads.

Vasilika 
Vasilika (pop. 4,264) which means Royal is a big village located in the northwest of the island. Vasilika is the third largest area in Salamis by population after Salamis City and Aianteio. Vasilika has a sandy large beach apt for swimming.

Xeno 
Xeno (pop. 786) is located in the northwest corner of the island. The area was so named because the first residents were not from Salamis but from nearby Piraeus.

Villages in the municipal unit of Ampelakia

Kynosoura 
Kynosoura (pop. 69) is a small peninsula located in the east of the island. The name probably comes from the shape of the peninsula, long and thin and pointed at the end. In the south are a few houses. In the north are the remains of an ancient tumulus thought to be the burial site of Greek warriors in the Battle of Salamis. Nearby is a dockyard, which constructs and fixes ships including oil tankers and containers.

Selinia 
Selinia (pop. 2,523) is a resort located a few kilometers southeast of Salamis city. Selinia is the weekend resort of many Athenians due to its proximity to Athens. Selinia also features restaurants and taverns.

Culture

Education 
Salamis island has eleven primary schools (ten public and one private), four high schools, and four lycees. The majority of students are proficient in school, and the pupils (above 13 years) usually have acquired diplomas and certificates in English, in French, or in German such as ECCE, FCE, CPE, and ECPE. Many students from Salamis island also possess many computer skills. Many students also study abroad in countries such as the United States, the United Kingdom, Germany, and France. In the 1960s, 1970s, and 1980s, the pupils went to Italy for studies since it was close to Greece.

Recreational areas 
In Salamis Bay, a visitor can find many bars, cafeterias, beaches, and shops. The main cafeterias and bars are based in Agios Nikolaos, which is located in the western suburbs of Salamis city. The district is named for the church. Taverns and inns, which are located throughout the island, feature local food and dishes. The shops—which sell appliances, computers, clothing, souvenirs, and vehicles—are opened from 8:00 a.m. to 2:00 p.m. and from 5:30 p.m. to 9:00 p.m. on weekdays; from 9:00 a.m. to 1:30 p.m. and 6:00 p.m to 8:30 p.m. on Saturdays.

Clubs, activities and organizations 
The cultural activities that take place and the cultural organizations that operate in Salamina include: a Museum of Folklore Art and History, a Public Municipal Library, a Drama Club "Euripides" and a Dance Group "Erevna". Also, regional, traditional and seasonal festivals are organized throughout the year, indicatively: the Annual Festival, "Salaminia" (to commemorate the Naval Battle of Salamis), the "Fisherman's Festival" and the Carnival.

Sports 
Salamis island has four football teams: Aias (Ajax) Salaminas, Ampelakiakos F.C., A.E. Salaminas and Salaminomachoi.
In 2019 the Nautical Club "AGIOS NIKOLAOS" Yalas, became the Champion Sprint Canoeing Club of Greece, during the 23rd Greek National Development Sprint Canoeing Championship, winning 4 gold, 4 silver and 4 bronze medals.

Local newspapers and magazines 

Salamina-Press
30 Imeres tis Salaminas (30 Days of Salamina)
Anatropes  (Tippings)
Apopsi (Opinion)
Athlitikoi Palmoi (Athletic Vibrations)
I Enotita tis Salaminas (The Unity of Salamis)
I Nea Salamina (The New Salamis)

I Foni tis Salaminas (The Voice of Salamis)
Neo Ithos tis Salaminas (New Morale of Salamis)
Palmos tis Salaminas (Pulse of Salamis)
Politis me dikaioma (Citizen With Rights)
Salaminiaki Protoporia (Salaminian Vanguard)
Sports Week Salamina

Source:

Landmarks

Noted people

Mythological and ancient people 
Ajax the Great, the legendary king of Salamis island, son of Telamon and half-brother of Teucer
Cychreus, the first king of Salamis Island
Euripides, tragedian (480 BC – 406 BC)
Moerocles, orator (4th century BC)
Telamon, the king of Salamis Island, father of Ajax the Great and Teucer
Teucer, the half-brother of Ajax the Great, son of Telamon, warrior of Trojan War, and founder of the city-state of Salamis, Cyprus.

Modern people 
Dimitra Fimi (1978-), academic and writer
Georgios Karaiskakis (c. 1780–1827), Greek War of Independence hero, is buried on Salamis.
Polychronis Lempesis (1848–1913), painter
Anastas Kullurioti, publisher
Theodoros Pangalos (general)
Memos Mpegnis (1974- ), actor
Dimitrios Mpogris (1890–1964), playwright
Giorgos Papasideris (1902–1977), country singer, composer and lyricist
Angelos Sikelianos (1884–1951), poet and playwright, whose cottage was near the Monastery of Faneromeni.

Twin towns / sister cities 

Salamis Island is twinned with Famagusta, Cyprus (1998)

Gallery

See also 
Trojan War
Greek Revolution
Aeacus

References

External links 

Official website of Municipality of Salamina 
Official website of Municipality of Ampelakia 

 
Aegean islands
Islands of Attica
Landforms of Islands (regional unit)
Municipalities of Attica
Ports and harbours of Greece
Athenian colonies
Megarian colonies
Islands of Greece
Saronic Gulf
Greek city-states
Populated places in Islands (regional unit)
Arvanite settlements